The Constitution of Greece was created by the Fifth Revisionary Parliament of the Hellenes in 1974, after the fall of the Greek military junta and the start of the Third Hellenic Republic. It came into force on 11 June 1975 (adopted two days prior) and has been amended in 1986, 2001, 2008 and 2019.

The constitutional history of Greece goes back to the Greek War of Independence (1821–1832), during which the first three Greek constitutions were adopted by the revolutionary national assemblies. Syntagma Square (Plateia Syntagmatos) in Athens is named after the first constitution adopted in the modern Greek State.

Context
The Constitution consists of 120 articles, in four parts:
The first part (articles 1-3), Basic Provisions, establishes Greece as a presidential parliamentary democracy (or republic – the Greek δημοκρατία can be translated both ways), and confirms the prevalence of the Orthodox Church in Greece.
The second part (Individual and Social Rights, articles 4-25), concerns individual and social rights, whose protection has been reinforced after the Revision of 2001. The new provisions regulate subjects such as the protection of personal data and the competence of certain independent authorities.
The third part (Organization and functions of the State, articles 26-105) describes the organization and function of the State.  Article 28 formally integrates international laws and international conventions into Greek law.
The fourth part (Special, Final and Transitory Provisions, articles 106-120) comprises special, final and transitory provisions.

Constitutional amendments

The Constitution of 1975 has been revised four times: in 1986, 2001, 2008 and 2019.

Constitutional revision
Parliament has the right to revise or amend the Constitution, except for the articles dealing with the "Form of the State" (the establishment of the presidential, parliamentary republic) and the articles safeguarding human rights and freedoms, which are unalterable. Revision of the Constitution is initiated by a motion by at least one sixth of MPs, and approved by a supermajority of three fifths of MPs, expressed twice, in two separate votes at least one month apart. In this case, the business of revision is transferred to the next term of Parliament, i.e., after the following legislative elections. Parliament may then ratify the revision by a 50% plus one majority. If the initial motion for revision only achieved a 50% plus one majority, then a three fifths supermajority of the new Parliament is required. A Parliament thus endowed by its predecessor with the powers of revising the Constitution is officially named a "Revisional Parliament" and is enumerated separately from "Ordinary" Parliamentary terms. In recent years, the 1974 Parliament was titled "5th Revisional", as it operated under, and amended, the 1952 constitution. The resulting constitution of 1975 was essentially an entirely new constitution, especially so since it incorporated the outcome of the 1974 plebiscite that established the republic in the place of constitutional monarchy. Nevertheless, it was officially deemed a revision of the 1952 one. The 1986 parliament was the "6th Revisional"; the 2001 one the "7th Revisional Parliament"; the 2004 Parliament was the "11th Ordinary Parliament" of the Third Hellenic Republic; the 2007 Parliament was the "8th Revisional Parliament"; the 2009 Parliament was the "12th Ordinary"; the first 2012 Parliament which resulted from the national election held on 6 May was the "13th Ordinary" (also referred to as the "Parliament of one day", because it formed for one day, only to be dismissed again in order for 17 June national election to be held, since no governmental majority could be secured) and the sitting 2012 Parliament is the "14th Ordinary". A minimum of five years must elapse after the successful conclusion of the revision process, before another may be initiated.

Constitutional history of Greece

During the modern history of Greece, the Constitution of 1975/1986/2001/2008/2019 is the last in a series of democratically adopted Constitutions (with the exception of the Constitutions of 1968 and 1973 imposed by a  dictatorship). The first of these Constitutions was adopted in 1822.  
The current constitution is formally a major revision of the constitution of 1952, as effected by the 5th Revisional Parliament.

Notes

References

Further reading

External links

 The official text of the Greek Constitution as of 27 May 2008, source: Hellenic Parliament.
The official English language translation of the Greek Constitution as of 27 May 2008, source: Hellenic Parliament
An English translation with a link to the Greek text (1986 version)

1975 establishments in Greece
1970s in Greek politics
1975 in law
1975 documents
 
Law of Greece
Judiciary of Greece